In organosulfur chemistry, organosulfates are a class of organic compounds sharing a common functional group with the structure .  The  core is a sulfate group and the R group is any organic residue. All organosulfates are formally esters derived from alcohols and sulfuric acid although many are not prepared in this way.  Many sulfate esters are used in detergents, and some are useful reagents.  Alkyl sulfates consist of a hydrophobic hydrocarbon chain, a polar sulfate group (containing an anion) and either a cation or amine to neutralize the sulfate group.  Examples include: sodium lauryl sulfate (also known as sulfuric acid mono dodecyl ester sodium salt) and related potassium and ammonium salts.

Applications
Alkyl sulfates are commonly used as an anionic surfactant in liquid soaps and detergents used to clean wool, as surface cleaners, and as active ingredients in laundry detergents, shampoos and conditioners. They can also be found in household products such as toothpaste, antacids, cosmetics and foods. Generally they are found in consumer products at concentrations ranging from 3-20%. In 2003 approximately 118,000 t/a of alkyl sulfates were used in the US

Synthetic organosulfates
A common example is sodium lauryl sulfate, with the formula CH3(CH2)11OSO3Na. Also common in consumer products are the sulfate esters of ethoxylated fatty alcohols such as those derived from lauryl alcohol.  An example is sodium laureth sulfate, an ingredient in some cosmetics.

Alkylsulfate can be produced from alcohols, which in turn are obtained by hydrogenation of animal or vegetable oils and fats or using the Ziegler process or through oxo synthesis.  If produced from oleochemical feedstock or the Ziegler process, the hydrocarbon chain of the alcohol will be linear. If derived using the oxo process, a low level of branching will appear usually with a methyl or ethyl group at the C-2 position, containing even and odd amounts of alkyl chains. These alcohols react with chlorosulfuric acid:
ClSO3H  +  ROH   →    ROSO3H  +  HCl
Alternatively, alcohols can be converted to the half sulfate esters using sulfur trioxide:
SO3  +  ROH   →    ROSO3H

Some organosulfates can be prepared by the Elbs persulfate oxidation of phenols and the Boyland–Sims oxidation of anilines.

Dialkylsulfates

A less common family of organosulfates have the formula RO-SO2-OR'.  They are prepared from sulfuric acid and the alcohol. The main examples are  diethyl sulfate and dimethyl sulfate, colourless liquids that are used as reagents in organic synthesis.  These compounds are potentially dangerous alkylating agents.  Dialkylsulfates do not occur in nature.

Natural sulfate esters

Several classes of sulfate esters exist in nature. Especially common are sugar derivatives such as keratan sulfate, chondroitin sulfate, and the anticoagulant heparin.  Post-translational modifications of some proteins entail sulfation, often at the phenol group of tyrosine residues. A steroidal sulfate is estradiol sulfate, a latent precursor to the hormone estrogen.

A major portion of soil sulfur is in the form of sulfate esters.

Metabolism
Sulfate is an inert anion, so nature activates it by the formation of ester derivative of adenosine 5'-phosphosulfate (APS) and 3'-phosphoadenosine-5'-phosphosulfate (PAPS).  Many organisms utilize these reactions for metabolic purposes or for the biosynthesis of sulfur compounds required for life. The formation and hydrolysis of natural sulfate esters are catalyzed by sulfatases (aka sulfohydrolases).

Safety
Because they are widely used in commercial products, the safety aspects of organosulfates are heavily investigated.

Human Health 
Alkyl sulfates if ingested are well-absorbed and are metabolized into a C3, C4 or C5 sulfate and an additional metabolite. The highest irritant of the alkyl sulfates is sodium laurylsulfate, with the threshold before irritation at a concentration of 20%. Surfactants in consumer products are typically mixed, reducing likelihood of irritation. According to OECD TG 406, alkyl sulfates in animal studies were not found to be skin sensitizers.

Laboratory studies have not found alkyl sulfates to be genotoxic, mutagenic or carcinogenic. No long-term reproductive effects have been found.

Environment 
The primary disposal of alkyl sulfate from used commercial products is wastewater. Alkyl sulfates biodegrade easily, even starting likely before reaching the WWTP. Once at the treatment plant, they are rapidly removed by biodegradation. Invertebrates were found to be the most-sensitive trophic group to alkyl sulfates. Sodium laurylsulfate tested on Uronema parduczi, a protozoan, was found to have the lowest effect value with the 20 h-EC5 being . Chronic exposure tests with C12 to C18 with the invertebrate Ceriodaphnia dubia found the highest toxicity is with C14 (NOEC was 0.045 mg/L).

In terms of thermal stability, alkyl sulfates degrade well before reaching their boiling point due to low vapor pressure (for C8-18 from 10-11 to 10-15 hPa). Soil sorption is proportional to carbon chain length, with a length of 14 and more having the highest sorption rate. Soil concentrations have been found to vary from  dw.

References